In mathematics, a shrewd cardinal is a certain kind of large cardinal number introduced by , extending the definition of indescribable cardinals.

For an ordinal λ, a cardinal number κ is called λ-shrewd if for every proposition φ, and set A ⊆ Vκ with (Vκ+λ, ∈, A) ⊧ φ there exists an α, λ' < κ with (Vα+λ', ∈, A ∩ Vα) ⊧ φ. It is called shrewd if it is λ-shrewd for every λ(Definition 4.1) (including λ > κ).

This definition extends the concept of indescribability to transfinite levels. A λ-shrewd cardinal is also μ-shrewd for any ordinal μ < λ.(Corollary 4.3) Shrewdness was developed by Michael Rathjen as part of his ordinal analysis of Π12-comprehension. It is essentially the nonrecursive analog to the stability property for admissible ordinals.

More generally, a cardinal number κ is called λ-Πm-shrewd if for every Πm proposition φ, and set A ⊆ Vκ with (Vκ+λ, ∈, A) ⊧ φ there exists an α, λ' < κ with (Vα+λ', ∈, A ∩ Vα) ⊧ φ.(Definition 4.1) Πm is one of the levels of the Lévy hierarchy, in short one looks at formulas with m-1 alternations of quantifiers with the outermost quantifier being universal.

For finite n, an n-Πm-shrewd cardinals is the same thing as a Πmn-indescribable cardinal.

If κ is a subtle cardinal, then the set of κ-shrewd cardinals is stationary in κ.(Lemma 4.6) Rathjen does not state how shrewd cardinals compare to unfoldable cardinals, however.

λ-shrewdness is an improved version of λ-indescribability, as defined in Drake; this cardinal property differs in that the reflected substructure must be (Vα+λ, ∈, A ∩ Vα), making it impossible for a cardinal κ to be κ-indescribable. Also, the monotonicity property is lost: a λ-indescribable cardinal may fail to be α-indescribable for some ordinal α < λ.

References 
 
 

Large cardinals